Rotation Curation, also #RotationCuration, is the concept of rotating the spokesperson on a broad scoped social media account. Such a scope can be a location, a country, an organization, a group, and so on. The concept is prominent on Twitter, but has also been ported to Instagram (for example la Bio au Labo).

History
The concept originated December 10, 2011, when Svenska Institutet and VisitSweden launched Curators of Sweden. The project hands the official Twitter account @Sweden to a new Swedish person every week to manage, with the expressed goal to manifest Swedish diversity and progressiveness through their own personality.

The original idea has been reported on in mass media around the world  and inspired the launch of many similar projects. The Twitter account @PeopleofLeeds started January 15, 2012, where citizens of Leeds represent their hometown. January 18, 2012, @WeAreAustralia and @TweetWeekUSA, followed by @CuratorsMexico and @BasquesAbroad January 21. On April 12 the people of The Netherlands got their account, known as @Netherlanders. All of these are unofficial accounts without governmental influence or sanctions, as well as the actual foundation for the concept of Rotation Curation, which is to let official and unofficial projects, countries, cities, companies, cultural, and, or other types of groups to rotate their spokespersons, curators, every week.

Initially most of these projects all had a location in common, which saw the creation of the concept Location Curation, with the hashtag #LocationCuration. When the idea spread to organisations unbound by location the expression was abandoned. Because of their common concept of rotating the holder of the account, people on Twitter decided to use the expression #RotationCuration, which was coined by the user @auldzealand March 22, 2012.

There are now also several science-themed rotation curation accounts used for science outreach to a broader community, including @RealScientists, @Biotweeps, and @Astrotweeps.

Although it was said above that the concept originated December 10, 2011, it is worth mentioning that something was probably started already in April 2011: "Travelling without Moving" for the Twitter account named @Trawom. The intention of this project is that this Twitter account is supposed to travel the world by being handed over from person to person. On April 18, 2011, Twitter user @Pausanias wrote on his blog:

So the first one who migrated the principle of Rotation Curation to Twitter was Maxim Loick, a.k.a @Pausanias.

See also
Svenska Institutet

References

2011 in Internet culture
2011 introductions
Swedish inventions
Crowdsourcing
Twitter